The 2022 Auckland mayoral election was held on 8 October 2022 to determine the Mayor of Auckland, as part of the 2022 New Zealand local elections. The incumbent mayor since 2016, Phil Goff, did not seek re-election. Campaign issues include transport strategy, council finance issues and the Three Waters reform programme. After provisional vote counts were released on 8 October, Wayne Brown declared victory, and Efeso Collins conceded the election.

Candidates

Withdrawn candidates
Leo Molloy, businessman, withdrew on 12 August 2022
Jake Law, teacher and model. Standing for Albany ward and Hibiscus and Bays Local Board in council elections instead.
Viv Beck, withdrew unofficially on 16 September 2022, and officially remained a candidate.

Declined to be candidates
Paula Bennett, former National MP
Phil Goff, incumbent mayor
Richard Hills, Auckland councillor
Nikki Kaye, former National MP
Mark Mitchell, National MP
David Shearer, former Labour MP
Maurice Williamson, former National MP

Campaign

Labour and Green endorsements of Collins
In elections from 2010 to 2016, mayoral candidates Len Brown and Phil Goff ran as independents and were supported by City Vision, an Auckland group affiliated to the national Labour and Green parties. In 2019, Goff was endorsed directly by Labour. Goff, the incumbent mayor, stated he would announce his intentions on running for a third term in February 2022. Efeso Collins and Richard Hills, Auckland councillors affiliated with Labour, were both reported to be exploring mayoral candidacies while awaiting Goff's decision, in order to avoid crowding the ballot. Frustrated with Goff's timeline in light of an approaching election campaign, Collins formally announced his candidacy on 26 January. On 10 February, Hills announced he would decline to run for mayor, citing the recent birth of his son. Labour announced a process to decide the party's endorsee on 15 February; the process was uncontested, and on 28 February, Labour endorsed Collins' independent campaign. On 15 March, the Green Party announced their endorsement of Collins. This was the first time that the party endorsed a mayoral candidate in Auckland.

National and C&R endorsements
Molloy claimed on 17 June 2022 while on The AM Show that the National Party had offered to endorse his mayoral campaign, adding that Beck should leave the race. When asked who specifically he had been talking to, Molloy did not identify any individuals, replying "everybody". A spokesperson for National leader Christopher Luxon stated they weren't sure who Molloy was referring to and that they had not endorsed him. The National Party-aligned Communities and Residents local body group endorsed Viv Beck on 12 July 2022.

Debates
The Penrose Business Association hosted a debate between seven candidates on 23 June. A debate hosted by the Takapuna Beach Business Association on 6 July saw seven candidates discuss issues such as climate change and the possibility of a second harbour crossing. On 20 July, Shane Te Pou moderated a debate at Ngā Whare Waatea in Māngere for Radio Waatea between four candidates.

Six candidates attended a University of Auckland Debating Society on 26 July moderated by Jack Tame, during which Ted Johnston was egged after unknowingly referring to an audience member with Tourette syndrome as "team Efeso" (in reference to Efeso Collins), for which he later apologised. Wayne Brown was absent due to the debate conflicting with a campaign fundraising dinner.

Campaign issues

Transport

Collins' flagship policy is free public transport, which is estimated to cost $100–$250 million annually. He has pointed out that some Auckland residents spend 30% of their income on transport, and that free public transport is "the first and best way" to reduce Auckland's greenhouse gas emissions.

Brown has not announced a transport strategy. Instead, he will "get rid of the road cones" and "make sure all the existing projects are finished before new ones are started".

Law supports better alternatives to cars, and specifically the expansion of the rail network. Lord also opposes the light rail project, and wants to lobby the central Government to spend the funds in more critical regions such as passenger rail to Kumeu, and wants to put overhead transport options on the table.

Molloy supported a one-year trial of free public transport, funded through the existing regional fuel tax revenue.Molloy described himself as pro-private car and was in favour of a congestion charge of $3.50. Molloy was not interested in encouraging more cycling. He opposed the proposed light rail project and claimed it "will never happen in my lifetime". Beck did not support universal fare-free public transport, but supported targeted concessions.

Council finances
Collins is open to discussions around rebalancing the proportions of council income coming from rates, dividends from public assets and central government contributions, and is "proud" that rates only make up half of Auckland's revenue, but is not ruling out rates increases. He opposes the sale of strategic assets, including shares in Auckland Airport.

Lord has pledged to focus on providing core services, promising to be "focused on necessities over niceties", and is adamant that the council can be a much more streamlined and efficient entity.

Molloy stated that the $1 billion annual spending on wages for council employees needs to be reduced, and proposed removing the middle layer of council administration. He planned to limit rates rises to the rate of inflation of council expenses. He proposed selling Ports of Auckland and the leasehold estate of the land they operate on, which he claimed would raise $7 billion and $10 billion, respectively, and was open to selling shares in Auckland Airport and Eke Panuku, the council-controlled organisation responsible for urban redevelopment. Beck saw future rates rises as "difficult", and supported the sale and movement of the central port.

Water reform
The government is proposing a Three Waters reform programme to centralise water management infrastructure between territorial authorities. Collins supports the reforms, but notes that Auckland has invested significantly into Watercare Services and has issues around the details of the future governance of assets should the reforms proceed. Brown, Lord and Johnston oppose the reforms, with Brown calling the proposed co-governance model for water management  "a dumb idea".

Co-governance 
Co-governance represents a power-sharing arrangement between iwi and elected representatives. Collins fully supports co-governance. Wayne Brown believes it is acceptable in certain cases, such as the Whanganui River and where iwi have a long and strong interest in matters like the maunga (volcanoes). Lord opposes co-governance completely.

Opinion polling
Unknown and undecided voters are excluded from these counts but may represent a large proportion of the voters e.g. 33-43% in two September polls.

Results

By local board

Source:

Notes

References

Mayoral elections in Auckland
Auckland Council
2022 elections in New Zealand
October 2022 events in New Zealand